Dalugama Mudiyanselage Naveen Dilshan Gunawardene (born 20 May 1998) is a Sri Lankan cricketer. He made his first-class debut for Sebastianites Cricket and Athletic Club in Tier B of the 2019–20 Premier League Tournament on 6 February 2020. He made his List A debut for Chilaw Marians Cricket Club in the 2017–18 Premier Limited Overs Tournament on 12 March 2018. He made his Twenty20 debut on 4 March 2021, for Kurunegala Youth Cricket Club in the 2020–21 SLC Twenty20 Tournament.

References

External links
 

1998 births
Living people
Sri Lankan cricketers
Chilaw Marians Cricket Club cricketers
Kurunegala Youth Cricket Club cricketers
Sebastianites Cricket and Athletic Club cricketers
Place of birth missing (living people)